Pusser's Rum is a brand name of rum produced by Pusser's Rum Ltd., based in the British Virgin Islands. Nine years after the Royal Navy discontinued the daily rum ration in 1970, the company was founded to produce the rum from the original Royal Navy recipe, using a blend of five West Indian rums.

History
"Pusser" is Royal Navy slang for a purser, a ship's supply officer, now called a Logistics Officer. Thus the word came to connote "one hundred per cent Service," as in "pusser's issue." "Pusser's issue" applies to anything supplied by the Royal Navy, such as a "pusser's grip", a canvas bag that sailors may use instead of a suitcase (it folds flat and is thus easy to stow on board ship).

The Royal Navy issued the last tot (ration) to "the fleet" on 31 July 1970. Since then, this has been known in Royal Naval Slang as "Black Tot Day." The remaining rum stocks were put up for auction. They were bought by Brian Cornford, shipped to Gibraltar and held in a secure bonded warehouse. As each visiting Royal Navy ship visited Gibraltar, it was the task of Cornford and his general manager, John Kania, to supply individual, wax-dated, corked, wicker-covered demijohns containing full strength (approx 110 proof) to the ships. When the individual gallon jars were finally sold, the large wooden barrels were tapped. It was found that over the years some of the contents in each wood barrel had evaporated, lowering the alcohol concentration somewhat. The barrelled rum was decanted into litre bottles and sold primarily to RN, RAF and Army messes and selected local pubs.

Some of this rum still pops up in premium auction houses. Because of the wax seal the alcohol concentration is similar to when it was bottled. It attracts high prices both because it is aged spirits, and because of its historical significance. 

In 1979, nearly a decade after the Royal Navy abandoned the custom of the daily tot of rum, company founder Charles Tobias obtained the rights to blending information associated with the naval rum ration and formed the company to produce the spirit according to the original Admiralty recipe, a blend of five West Indian rums without colouring agents.

In 1989, Pusser's Rum Ltd. filed a US trademark for the name and recipe for the Painkiller, a cocktail from the Virgin Islands made with rum, cream of coconut, pineapple juice, and orange juice. When a Tiki bar named Painkiller opened in the Lower East Side of New York City in May of 2011, Pusser's sent a cease and desist order to owners Giuseppe Gonzalez and Richard Boccato, both for the bar's name and for selling Painkiller cocktails made with rums other than Pusser's. Gonzalez and Boccato reached an out-of-court settlement with Pusser's, which included them renaming the bar to PKNY. In response to the news, numerous bartenders organized a boycott against Pusser's.

Philanthropy
As part of the agreement with the Admiralty granting Tobias the right to produce Pusser's Rum to the original specification, the Royal Navy Sailors’ Fund, a naval charity more commonly called the ‘Tot’ Fund, receives a substantial donation from the worldwide sales of the rum on an ongoing basis.

See also
 Grog 
 Painkiller (cocktail) 
 Splice the mainbrace

References

External links
 Pusser's Rum: Official site
Pusser's British West Indies : Official Website

Rums